The Independent Institute of Education (IIE) is a private higher education institution in South Africa and is a wholly owned subsidiary of investment holding company ADvTECH Group Limited. The IIE confers a range of tertiary qualifications, through various faculties, via a number of academic institutions in South Africa, including Vega, Varsity College, Rosebank College and The Business School at Varsity College.

History

The Independent Institute of Education was founded in 2004 as the academic leadership and governance body within the ADvTECH Group. It is responsible for overseeing all of the Group's academic campuses, and developing, assessing, certifying, and overseeing the delivery of curricula at its campuses.

In June 2015, ADvTECH reported that The IIE had 31,000 tertiary students, 25,000 of whom are full-time, enrolled across 20 campuses in South Africa.

Divisions and Structure

The IIE oversees a number of academic institutions in South Africa, including:

The IIE confers a broad range of qualifications, covering a variety of NQF levels, organized across its various faculties. The Institute also operates a number of workshops and short courses, and offers distance education for some of its qualifications.

Tuition for other institutions such as Unisa, UFS, and IMM has also been available on some IIE campuses, but this provision is now being phased out in line with regulatory requirements.

Accreditation

The IIE is registered with the Department of Higher Education and Training as a private higher education provider, under the Higher Education Act, 1997. The IIE is also accredited by the British Accreditation Council.

References

Education companies of South Africa
Companies based in Johannesburg